Paceship Yachts Limited was a Canadian, and later American, boat builder originally based in Mahone Bay, Nova Scotia. The company was founded in 1962 and specialized in the design and manufacture of fiberglass sailboats.

History
The company's predecessor was the Mahone Bay Plycraft Company Ltd, which sold plywood boats as kits for amateur construction, as well as completed boats. These were marketed under various brand names.

The Industrial Shipping Company Limited of Nova Scotia (ISC) produced plywood boats for Mahone Bay Plycraft in its Mahone Bay factory, until the building burned down in 1956. The factory was rebuilt and plywood boat construction restarted, but it quickly shifted to building boats from a then-new material, fibreglass, becoming one of the earliest builders of fibreglass small powerboats and sailboats.

By 1962 the sailboats were produced under the Paceship name and it became a division of ISC. The Paceship division was bought out in 1965 by the Atlantic Bridge Company Limited of Nova Scotia (ABCO), a company that also built powerboats.

In 1975 Paceship Yachts and its tooling were sold to American Machine and Foundry (AMF Corp), a large American conglomerate. They relocated Paceship production to Connecticut in the United States, including the Paceship PY23 and PY26 sailboats. Paceship Yachts operated as a division of AMF from 1975 until 1981. The early 1980s recession impacted sailboat sales and, as a result, AMF sold the PY26 design and tooling to Tanzer Industries in 1981. Tanzer changed the design to a deck-stepped mast and sold it as the Tanzer 27. Tanzer Industries itself went out of business in May 1986.

Atlantic Bridge's fibreglass operations were moved into the former Paceship building and the company was renamed ABCO Plastics Limited, while yacht building ceased. ABCO Plastics was sold in 1988 and renamed ABCO Industries Limited. The former factory location is now owned by Reinforced Plastics Systems Inc.

Boats 

Summary of sailboats built by Paceship (year first built by any manufacturer):

Tech Dinghy - 1934
Falcon 16 - 1954
International FJ - 1956
East Wind 24 - 1962
East Wind 25 - 1962
Paceship P2-20 - 1962
Cruisette 20 - 1963
Paceship P 12 - 1963
Peregrine 16 - 1963
Acadian 30 - 1964
Mouette 19 - 1964
Paceship 2-16 - 1964
Paceship 29 - 1964
Paceship 17 - 1966
Westwind 24 - 1966
Bluejacket 23 - 1967
Acadian 30 Yawl - 1968
Paceship 32 - 1968
Northwind 29 - 1969
Paceship 23 - 1969
Paceship P 14 - 1969
Paceship 20 - 1970
Chance 32 - 1972
Chance 32/28 - 1972
Paceship PY26 - 1972
Chance 29/25 - 1973
Paceship PY23 - 1973
Seidelmann 24-1 - 1981

See also
List of sailboat designers and manufacturers

References

External links

Paceship Yachts